Newtown Township is the name of some places in the U.S. state of Pennsylvania:

 Newtown Township, Bucks County, Pennsylvania
 Newtown Township, Delaware County, Pennsylvania

See also 
 Newton Township, Lackawanna County, Pennsylvania
 North Newton Township, Cumberland County, Pennsylvania
 South Newton Township, Cumberland County, Pennsylvania
 Newtown, Pennsylvania (disambiguation)

Pennsylvania township disambiguation pages